Arcane is the debut studio album led by drummer Cindy Blackman which was recorded in 1987 and released on the Muse label.

Reception

Scott Yanow of AllMusic stated, "Cindy Blackman's debut as a leader finds the talented drummer showing a great deal of confidence and holding her own with her illustrious sidemen ... The music is modern hard bop, and all of the musicians play up to par in their concise solos ... A strong start to Cindy Blackman's productive recording career".

Track listing 
All compositions by Cindy Blackman except where noted
 "Arcane" – 5:12
 "Late Autumn" – 5:45
 "Dual Force" – 6:32
 "Incindyary (Drum Solo)" – 4:32
 "Teeter Totter" (Joe Henderson) – 7:11
 "Mirrored Glances" – 5:36
 "Deceptacon" (Buster Williams) – 6:39
 "The Awakening" – 7:07 Additional track on CD reissue

Personnel 
Cindy Blackman - drums
Wallace Roney - trumpet (tracks 1-3 & 5-8)
Kenny Garrett - alto saxophone (tracks 1, 3, 6 & 7)
Joe Henderson - tenor saxophone (tracks 2, 5 & 8)
Larry Willis - piano (tracks 1-3 & 5-8)
Buster Williams (tracks 1, 3, 6 & 7), Clarence Seay (tracks 2, 5 & 8) - bass

References 

Cindy Blackman albums
1988 albums
Muse Records albums
Albums recorded at Van Gelder Studio